James Montraville Moody (February 12, 1858 – February 5, 1903) was a United States Representative from North Carolina.

Moody was born near what is now Robbinsville, Graham (then Cherokee) County, North Carolina, February 12, 1858 and moved with his parents to Haywood County. He attended the common schools and Waynesville Academy, also Candler College, Buncombe County, North Carolina. He studied law and was admitted to the bar in 1881 and commenced practice in Waynesville, Haywood County, North Carolina.

He was a delegate to the Republican State conventions in 1888, 1892, 1896, and 1900 and to the Republican National Convention in 1896 and 1900. He served as prosecuting attorney of the twelfth judicial district of North Carolina 1886–1900. He was a member of the State senate 1894–1896.

During the Spanish–American War he served as major and chief commissary of United States Volunteers on the staff of brigadier general J. Warren Keifer. He was elected as a Republican to the Fifty-seventh United States Congress and served from March 4, 1901, until his death in Waynesville, North Carolina, February 5, 1903. His interment was in Green Hill Cemetery.

See also
List of United States Congress members who died in office (1900–49)

External links
 
 Memorial addresses on the life and character of James M. Moody, late a representative from Virginia delivered in the House of Representatives and Senate frontispiece 1903

1858 births
1903 deaths
Republican Party members of the United States House of Representatives from North Carolina
Republican Party North Carolina state senators
19th-century American politicians
People from Robbinsville, North Carolina